Vojtech Horváth (born 28 June 1984) is a Slovak football midfielder who currently plays for the Fortuna Liga club FC DAC 1904 Dunajská Streda.

Career statistics

External links
AS Trenčín profile

References

1984 births
Living people
Slovak footballers
Association football midfielders
FK Inter Bratislava players
FC Petržalka players
AS Trenčín players
Bruk-Bet Termalica Nieciecza players
FC DAC 1904 Dunajská Streda players
Slovak Super Liga players
Slovak expatriate footballers
Slovak expatriate sportspeople in Poland
Expatriate footballers in Poland
Sportspeople from Dunajská Streda
FC ŠTK 1914 Šamorín players